The 1954 Pittsburgh Steelers season was the franchise's 22nd in the National Football League.

Regular season

Schedule

Game summaries

Week 1 (Sunday September 26, 1954): Green Bay Packers 

at City Stadium, Green Bay, Wisconsin

 Game time: 
 Game weather: 
 Game attendance: 20,675
 Referee: 
 TV announcers: 

Scoring Drives:

 Green Bay – Reid 69 run (Cone kick)
 Pittsburgh – Lattner 14 pass from Finks (Kissell kick)
 Green Bay – Howton 44 pass from Rote (Cone kick)
 Green Bay – FG Cone 45
 Pittsburgh – Nickel 2 pass from Finks (Kissell kick)
 Green Bay – FG Cone 32
 Pittsburgh – Mathews 37 pass from Finks (Held kick)

Week 2 (Saturday October 2, 1954): Washington Redskins  

at Forbes Field, Pittsburgh, Pennsylvania

 Game time: 
 Game weather: 
 Game attendance: 22,492
 Referee: 
 TV announcers: 

Scoring Drives:

 Pittsburgh – Nickel 25 pass from Held (Held kick)
 Pittsburgh – Lattner 1 run (kick blocked)
 Pittsburgh – Rogel 1 run (Held kick)
 Pittsburgh – Sulima 5 pass from Finks (Held kick)
 Pittsburgh – Brandt 9 run (Held kick)
 Washington – Dorow 1 run (Felton kick)
 Pittsburgh – FG Held 15

Week 3 (Saturday October 9, 1954): Philadelphia Eagles  

at Connie Mack Stadium, Philadelphia, Pennsylvania

 Game time: 
 Game weather: 
 Game attendance: 37,322
 Referee: 
 TV announcers: 

Scoring Drives:

 Pittsburgh – FG Held 31
 Philadelphia – Walston 24 pass from Thomason (Walston kick)
 Philadelphia – Williams 11 run (Walston kick)
 Philadelphia – FG Walston 14
 Pittsburgh – Butler 23 interception (Held kick)
 Pittsburgh – Safety, Thomason tackled in end zone by McPeak
 Pittsburgh – Lattner 7 run (Held kick)
 Pittsburgh – FG Held 17
 Philadelphia – Pihos 13 pass from Burk (Walston kick)

Week 4 (Sunday October 17, 1954): Cleveland Browns  

at Forbes Field, Pittsburgh, Pennsylvania

 Game time: 
 Game weather: 
 Game attendance: 31,256
 Referee: 
 TV announcers: 

Scoring Drives:

 Cleveland – Reynolds 5 run (Groza kick)
 Pittsburgh – Mathews 7 pass from Finks (Held kick)
 Cleveland – Jones 37 pass from Graham (Groza kick)
 Pittsburgh – Rogel 14 pass from Finks (kick failed)
 Pittsburgh – Butler 41 interception (Held kick)
 Pittsburgh – Lattner 12 run (Held kick)
 Cleveland – Lavelli 29 pass from Graham (kick blocked)
 Pittsburgh – Mathews 78 pass from Finks (Held kick)
 Pittsburgh – Mathews 8 pass from Finks (Held kick)
 Pittsburgh – Mathews 3 run (Held kick)
 Cleveland – Lavelli 24 pass from Graham (Groza kick)
 Pittsburgh – Craft 81 interception (Held kick)

Week 5 (Saturday October 23, 1954): Philadelphia Eagles  

at Forbes Field, Pittsburgh, Pennsylvania

 Game time: 
 Game weather: 
 Game attendance: 39,075
 Referee: 
 TV announcers: 

Scoring Drives:

 Pittsburgh – FG Kissell 24
 Pittsburgh – Nickel 52 pass from Burk (Walston kick)
 Philadelphia – Pihos 24 pass from Burk (Walston kick)
 Pittsburgh – Chandnois 5 run (Kissell kick)

Week 6 (Sunday October 31, 1954): Chicago Cardinals  

at Comiskey Park, Chicago, Illinois

 Game time: 
 Game weather: 
 Game attendance: 18,765
 Referee: 
 TV announcers: 

Scoring Drives:

 Pittsburgh – Nickel 15 pass from Finks (Kissell kick)
 Chicago Cardinals – Matson 91 kick return (Summerall kick)
 Chicago Cardinals – FG Summerall 24
 Chicago Cardinals – Matson 18 pass from McHan (Summerall kick)
 Pittsburgh – Lattner 1 run (Kissell kick)

Week 7 (Sunday November 7, 1954): New York Giants  

at Forbes Field, Pittsburgh, Pennsylvania

 Game time: 
 Game weather: 
 Game attendance: 25,158
 Referee: 
 TV announcers: 

Scoring Drives:

 New York Giants – Safety, Chandnois recovered blocked punt in own end zone, tackled by Nolan
 New York Giants – MacAfee 21 pass from Conerly (Agajanian kick)
 Pittsburgh – Lattner 5 run (kick blocked)
 New York Giants – Rote 23 pass from Conerly (Agajanian kick)
 New York Giants – Price 2 run (Agajanian kick)
 New York Giants – Topp 14 pass from Conerly (Agajanian kick)

Week 8 (Sunday November 14, 1954): Washington Redskins  

at Griffith Stadium, Washington, DC

 Game time: 
 Game weather: 
 Game attendance: 19,388
 Referee: 
 TV announcers: 

Scoring Drives:

 Washington – Wells 9 run (Janowicz kick)
 Pittsburgh – Lattner 24 pass from Finks (Kissell kick)
 Washington – FG Janowicz 32
 Washington – Taylor 42 pass from Scarbath (Janowicz kick)
 Pittsburgh – Nickel 4 pass from Finks (Kissell kick)

Week 9 (Saturday November 20, 1954): San Francisco 49ers  

at Forbes Field, Pittsburgh, Pennsylvania

 Game time: 
 Game weather: 
 Game attendance: 37,001
 Referee: 
 TV announcers: 

Scoring Drives:

 San Francisco – FG Soltau 24
 San Francisco – Jessup 44 pass from Tittle (Soltau kick)
 Pittsburgh – FG Kissell 31
 San Francisco – Perry 2 run (Soltau kick)
 San Francisco – Johnson 24 run (Soltau kick)
 San Francisco – Jessup 24 pass from Tittle (Soltau kick)

Week 10 (Sunday November 28, 1954): Chicago Cardinals  

at Forbes Field, Pittsburgh, Pennsylvania

 Game time: 
 Game weather: 
 Game attendance: 17,460
 Referee: 
 TV announcers: 

Scoring Drives:

 Pittsburgh – FG Bolkovac 21
 Pittsburgh – Mathews 29 pass from Finks (Bolkovac kick)
 Chicago Cardinals – Stonesifer 39 pass from McHan (Summerall kick)
 Chicago Cardinals – Matson 60 pass from McHan (Summerall kick)
 Chicago Cardinals – FG Summerall 34
 Pittsburgh – Mathews 3 run (Bolkovac kick)
 Pittsburgh – FG Bolkovac 26

Week 11 (Sunday November 5, 1954): New York Giants  

at Polo Grounds, New York, New York

 Game time: 
 Game weather: 
 Game attendance: 16,856
 Referee: 
 TV announcers: 

Scoring Drives:

 New York Giants – Price 7 run (Agajanian kick)
 Pittsburgh – FG Bolkovac 15
 New York Giants – MacAfee 42 pass from Clatterbuck (Agajanian kick)
 New York Giants – Rote 42 pass from Clatterbuck (Agajanian kick)
 New York Giants – FG Agajanian 20

Week 12 (Sunday December 12, 1954): Cleveland Browns  

at Cleveland Municipal Stadium, Cleveland, Ohio

 Game time: 
 Game weather: 
 Game attendance: 28,064
 Referee: 
 TV announcers: 

Scoring Drives:

 Cleveland – Hanulak 13 run (Groza kick)
 Cleveland – Konz 54 interception (Groza kick)
 Cleveland – Hanulak 3 run (Groza kick)
 Cleveland – Hanulak 8 run (Groza kick)
 Pittsburgh – Mathews 47 pass from Finks (Bolkovac kick)
 Cleveland – Morrison 2 run (Groza kick)
 Cleveland – Reynolds 3 run (Groza kick)

Standings

References

Pittsburgh Steelers seasons
Pittsburgh Steelers
Pitts